Sasori (Japanese for scorpion) may refer to:

Sasori, the main character of the 1972 Japanese film Female Prisoner 701: Scorpion (Joshū Nana-maru-ichi Gō / Sasori) and its sequels
Sasori, a character in the Naruto universe

See also
 Sasori-gatame, a professional wrestling hold

Japanese words and phrases